Ransomes Industrial Estate, also known as Ransomes Europark is combined retail and business park located in Priory Heath Ward, Ipswich, on the southeastern edge of Ipswich in Suffolk, UK. It takes its name from Ransomes, Sims & Jefferies, which still maintains a presence on the park.

Predominantly the park consists of light industrial and logistics companies, although there is a growing number of retailers and offices including the head office for KDM International and MSC UK.

 it was announced that IKEA are in talks to take on part of the estate occupied by Crane Fluid Systems for a new store.

References

Buildings and structures in Ipswich
Business parks of England
Industrial parks in the United Kingdom